Gioventù alla sbarra is a 1953 Italian crime-drama film directed by Ferruccio Cerio.

Cast
Giorgio Albertazzi as Marco
Isa Barzizza as Florence - la canzonettista
Aldo Bettoni
Gemma Bolognesi
Marilyn Buferd as Lilly
Annette Ciarli
Attilio Dottesio
April Hennessy
Ave Ninchi as La sorella del giudice
Carlo Ninchi
Vittorio Sanipoli
Delia Scala as Franca
Lilli Scaringi
Massimo Serato as Gigi
Paolo Stoppa as Il giudice Benni
Henri Vidon

External links
 
 Gioventù alla sbarra at Variety Distribution

1953 films
1950s Italian-language films
Italian crime drama films
1953 crime drama films
Italian black-and-white films
1950s Italian films